Holsloot is a village in the Netherlands and is part of the Coevorden municipality in Drenthe.

Holsloot was first mentioned in 1846, and means "hollow ditch". The village developed after the Verlengde Hoogeveensche Vaart was dug, and is a linear settlement. The pub near the bridge became the centre of the village.

References 

Coevorden
Populated places in Drenthe